Mumbai-Pune-Mumbai 2 (also known as Mumbai-Pune-Mumbai – 2 Lagnala Yaychach) is a 2015 Indian Marathi language romantic drama film produced by Yashlita Enterprises Pvt. Ltd. and distributed by Mirah Entertainment, Everest Entertainment and Eros International.

It is the sequel to 2010's Marathi film Mumbai-Pune-Mumbai. Directed and written by Satish Rajwade, the film stars Swapnil Joshi, Mukta Barve in lead roles and Prashant Damle, Mangal Kenkre, Vijay Kenkre, Savita Prabhune, Asawari Joshi, Shruti Marathe, Suhas Joshi in supporting roles. The screenplay and the dialogues were written by Ashwini Shende.
The film score and soundtrack album are composed by Avinash-Vishwajeet with lyrics are penned by Shrirang Godbole, Ashwini Shende and Vishwajeet Joshi and cinematography by Suhas Gujarathi. Subhash Nakashe is the film's choreographer while the editing was done by Rajesh Rao.

The principal photography began in February 2015 and the film was released on 12 November 2015. The film marks as the most awaited film in Marathi.

Cast

Main 

 Swapnil Joshi as Gautam Pradhan
 Mukta Barve as Gauri Deshpande
 Prashant Damle as Shekhar Pradhan (Gautam's father)
 Mangala Kenkre as Sunita Pradhan (Gautam's mother)
 Vijay Kenkre as Ashok Deshpande (Gauri's father)
 Savita Prabhune as Sunanda Deshpande (Gauri's mother)

Supporting 

 Suhas Joshi as Suhas Pradhan (Gautam's grandmother) 
 Rupal Nand as Rashmi Deshpande (Gauri's sister)
 Asavari Joshi as Neerja (Gauri's aunt) 
 Shruti Marathe as Tanuja (Gauri's friend)
 Angad Mhaskar as Arnav (Gauri's boyfriend)

Production

Development

Following the positive response to Mumbai-Pune-Mumbai post release in June 2010, the team considered making a sequel to carry the story forward showing the next chapter of their marriage. The lead couple Mukta Barve and Swapnil Joshi reprises their roles from original and Prashant Damle, Mangal Kenkre, Vijay Kenkre, Savita Prabhune, Asawari Joshi, Shruti Marathe, Suhas Joshi are new additions to the cast.

Story
Gauri (Mukta Barve) and Gautam (Swapnil Joshi) mega marriage is about to happen. Even though Gautam and Gauri's families are excited about their marriage, But there is confusion in Gauri's mind about this marriage. Will this marriage happen?

Soundtrack

Avinash-Vishwajeet, the composers for Mumbai-Pune-Mumbai, will return to compose music and background score for the sequel with lyrics were written by Shrirang Godbole, Ashwini Shende, Sangeeta Barve and Vishwajeet Joshi.

The single song "Saath De Tu Mala" released as a teaser on 30 September 2015 and the full track was released on 13 October 2015. The song was sung by Hrishikesh Ranade, Bela Shende and written by Ashwini Shende, Vishwajeet Joshi.

The second song "Band Baja" was released as teaser on 26 October 2015 and published on YouTube. and the full track was released on 27 October 2015. The song was sung by Bela Shende, Anandi Joshi, Suresh Wadkar and Hrishikesh Ranade and lyrics are penned by Sangeeta Barve, Srirang Godbole & Vishwajeet Joshi. The third song "Mala Sanga" is released on 2 November 2015. The song is original from a Marathi play "Eka Lagnachee Gosht" and it is used in the movie, the song is considered as one of the famous songs in Marathi Theatre. The song originally sung by Prashant Damle while the lyrics were penned by Shrirang Godbole and composed by Ashok Patki.

Release

Marketing
The first look of the film's  official motion logo released on 17 July 2015 on YouTube. The films official small teaser released on YouTube on 24 July 2015. 
The official trailer released on 15 September 2015. The video song of the track "Saath De Tu Mala" was premiered on 13 October 2015. The "Band Baja" song video premiere was released on 27 October 2015. The "Mala Sanga" video song was released on 2 November 2015.

Distribution
The movie was released in Maharashtra, Karnataka, Goa, Gujarat, Madhya Pradesh and in International circuits like San Francisco on 12 November 2015 with English subtitles with 587 screens which after tremendous response increased to 680. The film is distributed by Eros International. The makers are planning to release the movie in Qatar, Dubai, United States, England and Australia soon.

Reception
The film has received positive reviews. ABP Majha gave 3.5 out of 5 stars and declared movie 'A light hearted romantic movie'. Pune Mirror gave 3.5 out of 5 stars and declared movie 'Back with a welcome change'. Maharashtra Times gave 4 out of 5 stars and declared movie 'emotional joyride'. Times of India gave 3 out of 5 stars. Wedding Planning MarketPlace Website marketforshaadi.com also provided positive review appreciating the movie story.

Box office
It collected  in first 3 days and collected  in its 4-days extended weekend. It collected  nett in first week. The film was loved by local Marathi crowd in many parts of Mumbai and Pune because of this movie's connection with these two cities.

See also
Highest grossing Marathi films

References

External links
 
 
 

2015 films
Indian romantic drama films
2010s Marathi-language films
Indian sequel films
Films directed by Satish Rajwade
2015 romantic drama films